Anglo is a prefix indicating a relation to, or descent from, the Angles, England, English culture, the English people or the English language.

Anglo may also refer to:
 Anglo (horse), a racehorse
 Anglo American plc, a mining company
 Anglo Irish Bank, an Irish bank
 Sistema Anglo de Ensino, a Brazilian educational system